Daniel Yéboah Tétchi (born 13 November 1984) is an Ivorian professional footballer who plays as a goalkeeper for Ivorian club Williamsville AC.

Club career
Yeboah was ASEC's second choice goalkeeper, until 2009.

In January 2019, he joined Ivorian third-tier side l’Inova Sporting Club Association. On 24 September 2019, he then joined Williamsville AC.

International career
Yeboah was part of the Ivory Coast U-20 team on the 2003 FIFA World Youth Championship in United Arab Emirates.

He was the first domestic based player to be picked for an Ivory Coast World Cup squad in 2010.

References

External links
 

1984 births
Living people
Association football goalkeepers
Ivorian footballers
Ivorian expatriate footballers
Ivory Coast international footballers
Ivory Coast under-20 international footballers
2010 FIFA World Cup players
2011 African Nations Championship players
2012 Africa Cup of Nations players
2013 Africa Cup of Nations players
Villemomble Sports players
People from Dabou
US Créteil-Lusitanos players
ASEC Mimosas players
Azam F.C. players
Williamsville Athletic Club players
Championnat National 3 players
Ivorian expatriate sportspeople in France
Ivorian expatriate sportspeople in Tanzania
Expatriate footballers in France
Expatriate footballers in Tanzania
Ivory Coast A' international footballers